São Caetano is a professional women's volleyball team, based in São Caetano do Sul, São Paulo (state), Brazil.

Current squad

References

External links

Brazilian volleyball clubs
Volleyball clubs in São Paulo (state)